Zu/Xabier Iriondo/Damo Suzuki is a self-titled split album by the Italian bands Zu, Xabier Iriondo and Damo Suzuki, released in 2008, as Phonometak n. 4, part of the Split 10" Series by SoundMetak, an experimental music laboratory in Milan, owned by the same Xabier Iriondo.

Track list
Side A

DAMO SUZUKI w/METAK NETWORK

 Dove Siete Stati L’Ultima Estate?
 Un Oceano Di Due Mezzelune

Side B

DAMO SUZUKI w/ZU & X. IRIONDO

 La Città Nascosta
 Il Territorio Proibito

References

Zu (band) albums
2008 albums